The 2006–07 NBA season was the 61st season of the National Basketball Association. The San Antonio Spurs were crowned the champions after sweeping the Cleveland Cavaliers in the NBA Finals.

Notable occurrences

The first NBA draft under the new CBA rules was conducted, where draftees must be at least a year removed from high school graduation and are at least 19 years old to be eligible. Andrea Bargnani of Italy was selected by the Toronto Raptors as the No. 1 pick, becoming the second foreign player without U.S. collegiate basketball background to be selected No. 1. Portland Trail Blazers guard Brandon Roy was named Rookie of the Year.
A new design for the official NBA game ball was revealed on June 28, 2006, at the NBA draft. Amid complaints by players and coaches, the league switched back to the previous ball on January 1, 2007.
The 2007 NBA All-Star Game was played on February 18, 2007, at the Thomas & Mack Center in Las Vegas, Nevada, the first time the event was held in a non-NBA city. The West defeated the East 153–132, with Kobe Bryant winning the game's MVP award.
For the second straight year, the Hornets played a split home schedule between New Orleans, Louisiana, and Oklahoma City, Oklahoma, due to Hurricane Katrina.
The Denver Nuggets and the New York Knicks entered into a brawl near the end of a December 16 match up. All ten players on the court at the time, including Nuggets star Carmelo Anthony (the league's leading scorer at the time), were ejected. Seven players were suspended as a result of the incident, the most notable of which was Carmelo Anthony's 15-game suspension.
After 11 seasons with the Philadelphia 76ers, All-Star guard Allen Iverson was traded to the Denver Nuggets with rookie Ivan McFarlin for Andre Miller and Joe Smith.
After the 2006 Playoff controversy, the format of team seeds changed. Each division winner may be seeded no lower than 4th, but the top non-division-winning playoff team may seed higher than a divisional champ if they have a better win–loss record. Home court advantage is given to the team with the better record, regardless of seeding.
The Phoenix Suns and the Dallas Mavericks notched multiple 12+ game win-streaks during the course of the regular season. The Suns rattled off streaks of 15 and 17 games straight (tied for fifth longest in NBA history), while the Mavericks' streaks stretched to 12, 13, and 17 games straight. The San Antonio Spurs joined these two teams by notching a 13-game winning streak.
Kobe Bryant notched four consecutive 50+ point games against the Portland Trail Blazers, Minnesota Timberwolves, Memphis Grizzlies and New Orleans/Oklahoma City Hornets; his streak ranks fourth behind streaks by Wilt Chamberlain. He also changed number from 8 to 24 this season.
Jason Kidd and Vince Carter of the New Jersey Nets become only the tenth pair of teammates in NBA history to record triple doubles in the same game. Nearly 20 years had passed since the last tandem, Michael Jordan and Scottie Pippen, performed this feat.
The Toronto Raptors won their first division title in the franchise's twelve-year history. It also marked the first time a Canadian-based NBA team had won a division title.
The Golden State Warriors, who had not qualified for the playoffs since 1994, became the first 8 seed to defeat a 1 seed in a best-of-seven playoff series, defeating the 67-win Dallas Mavericks in 6 games.
Dirk Nowitzki won the NBA MVP Award and Tony Parker won the NBA Finals MVP Award, the first time either award was won by a European-born player.
Long-time Boston Celtics coach and executive Red Auerbach died on October 28 of heart attack at age 89. Reeling with the loss of their patriarch, and being down two key contributors in Paul Pierce and Tony Allen, the Celtics finished the season with the second-worst record in the NBA, at 24–58, which included a franchise record 18–game losing streak. Another Celtics legend, Dennis Johnson, died on February 22, 2007, of the same ailment at age 52. This led to acquired both Kevin Garnett and Ray Allen, following the season, to turn their legendary franchise around to 42–game improvement will follow suit for the next five seasons for the three players.
The 2007 NBA Finals, won by the San Antonio Spurs 4–0 over the Cleveland Cavaliers, was the least-watched Finals series in NBA History until the 2020 NBA Finals, with a rating of 6.2.
Adidas became the official outfitter of the NBA they remained for the next ten years until Nike became the official outfitter in 2017.

Coaching changes

2006–07 NBA changes
Milwaukee Bucks – added new logo and new uniforms, replacing dark green, purple, grey and silver with remained dark green, grey and silver, added red to their color scheme added side panels to their jerseys and shorts.
New Jersey Nets – added new red road alternate uniforms with dark navy blue side panels to their jerseys and shorts.
New York Knicks – added new green road alternate uniforms with black side panels to their jerseys and shorts.
Utah Jazz – added new light blue road alternate uniforms with dark navy blue side panels to their jerseys and shorts.
Toronto Raptors – red road alternate uniforms they wore for the past three seasons became their primary road jersey.
Washington Wizards – added new gold and black road alternate uniforms with stars to their jerseys and shorts.

Final standings

By division

Eastern Conference

Western Conference

By conference

Playoffs
Teams in bold advanced to the next round. The numbers to the left of each team indicate the team's seeding in its conference, and the numbers to the right indicate the number of games the team won in that round. The division champions are marked by an asterisk. Home court advantage does not necessarily belong to the higher-seeded team, but instead the team with the better regular season record; teams enjoying the home advantage are shown in italics

Statistics leaders

Awards

Yearly awards
Most Valuable Player: Dirk Nowitzki, Dallas Mavericks
Defensive Player of the Year: Marcus Camby, Denver Nuggets
Rookie of the Year: Brandon Roy, Portland Trail Blazers
Sixth Man of the Year: Leandro Barbosa, Phoenix Suns
Most Improved Player: Monta Ellis, Golden State Warriors
Coach of the Year: Sam Mitchell, Toronto Raptors
Executive of the Year: Bryan Colangelo, Toronto Raptors
Sportsmanship Award: Luol Deng, Chicago Bulls

All-NBA First Team:
F Dirk Nowitzki – Dallas Mavericks
F Tim Duncan – San Antonio Spurs
C Amar'e Stoudemire – Phoenix Suns
G Steve Nash – Phoenix Suns
G Kobe Bryant – Los Angeles Lakers
NBA All-Defensive First Team:
F Tim Duncan – San Antonio Spurs
F Bruce Bowen – San Antonio Spurs
C Marcus Camby – Denver Nuggets
G Kobe Bryant – Los Angeles Lakers
G Raja Bell – Phoenix Suns
NBA All-Rookie First Team:
Brandon Roy – Portland Trail Blazers
Andrea Bargnani – Toronto Raptors
Randy Foye – Minnesota Timberwolves
Rudy Gay – Memphis Grizzlies
Jorge Garbajosa – Toronto Raptors (tie)
LaMarcus Aldridge – Portland Trail Blazers (tie)

All-NBA Second Team:
F LeBron James – Cleveland Cavaliers
F Chris Bosh – Toronto Raptors
C Yao Ming – Houston Rockets
G Gilbert Arenas – Washington Wizards
G Tracy McGrady – Houston Rockets
NBA All-Defensive Second Team:
F Kevin Garnett – Minnesota Timberwolves
F Tayshaun Prince – Detroit Pistons
C Ben Wallace – Chicago Bulls
G Kirk Hinrich – Chicago Bulls
G Jason Kidd – New Jersey Nets
All-NBA Rookie Second Team:
Paul Millsap – Utah Jazz
Adam Morrison – Charlotte Bobcats
Tyrus Thomas – Chicago Bulls
Craig Smith – Minnesota Timberwolves
Rajon Rondo – Boston Celtics (tie)
Walter Herrmann – Charlotte Bobcats (tie)
Marcus Williams – New Jersey Nets (tie)

All-NBA Third Team:
F Kevin Garnett – Minnesota Timberwolves
F Carmelo Anthony – Denver Nuggets
C Dwight Howard – Orlando Magic
G Dwyane Wade – Miami Heat
G Chauncey Billups – Detroit Pistons

Players of the month
The following players were named the Eastern and Western Conference Players of the Month.

Rookies of the month
The following players were named the Eastern and Western Conference Rookies of the Month.

See also
2007 NBA All-Star Game
2007 NBA playoffs
2007 NBA Finals

References

 
NBA
2006–07 in Canadian basketball